Cillín Johann Perera is an Australian photographer, entrepreneur and art collector who is best known for his "HomelessCEO" project. Between 2013 and 2017, Perera documented his travels by uploading a photo of every flight and each day on Instagram. The project encompassed more than 1000 images from dozens of countries and hundreds of flights and has been the subject of a touring exhibition.

Perera is the Founder and chief executive officer (CEO) of companies in Europe, the Middle East and Asia, including Language Direct, an online language teaching company, and Avilinga, a company offering translation for the aviation industry. He is a collector and patron of Australian Aboriginal art and is the founder of Australians for Overseas Representation.

Early life

Perera was born in London to an Irish mother and a Sri Lankan father, and grew up in Melbourne, Australia. In 1994 he won the Young Achievement Australia "Young Victorian Business Person of the Year" award. In 1995, he went to the United States to study visual arts and cinema under scholarship at Harvard University.

As a freshman, he started a non-profit company and a late-night show, Wide Awake with Cillin Perera. In 1997, Perera was assistant director of Joshua Oppenheimer's The Entire History of the Louisiana Purchase, an experimental documentary that won several festival awards.

After college Perera became self-employed, founding Language Direct, an online language teaching company, at the age of 27.

Homeless CEO

In July 2013, Perera started the "HomelessCEO" project, as a way to express the nomadic lifestyle of the modern CEO. Not spending more than four or five days in any one place, Perera took 168 flights and traveled more than 200,000 miles in 2014.

As of February 2016, Perera has published more than 1000 images from dozens of countries and hundreds of flights.

Technique

HomelessCEO is shot entirely on Apple iPod and iPhone. Perera's style puts a strong emphasis on composition and perspective, partly as a result of equipment limitations. For flights, Perera frequently shoots the view from the passenger window; the project contains possibly the world's largest collection of "airplane porthole" shots. Perera's other photographs show "haunting images of architecture, landscapes and urban settings mostly devoid of the human form." He very rarely features people in his photos unless they contribute to the composition of the shot.

Exhibitions

 July 2015: Dreamspace Gallery, London
 February 2016: ACP Ventures, Singapore
 June–September 2016: AKH Contemporary, Vienna, Austria
 November 2017: Melbourne, Australia (tbd)

In an innovative pricing strategy, all Instagram-published photographs are printed as uniques, and priced at $1 per "like" as determined by their popularity on Instagram at the time of sale.

Other activities

Perera is the founder and CEO of Switzerland-based Language Direct, an online language teaching company established in 2004, and UAE-based Avilinga, a company offering translation for the aviation, industry established in 2010. These companies have around 350 remote-working freelancers and clients on 5 continents.

Perera is involved in the support of Australian Aboriginal art through his private collection as well as philanthropic activities in the field.

Private life

Before embracing a nomadic lifestyle, Perera lived in Germany and Switzerland, where he had an apartment in Basel. He has Australian, British and Irish passports, and has been a resident of the UAE since 2012.

His partner currently lives in Turin. He has collections of classic British cars (including Rolls-Royce and Lotus), and Australian Aboriginal art.

References

External links
 homelessCEO at Instagram
 The Rules of @homelessCEO
 homelessCEO exhibition page at DreamSpace Gallery 

Living people
Year of birth missing (living people)
British emigrants to Australia
Australian photographers
New media artists
Harvard University alumni
Australian chief executives